Yount is an unincorporated settlement in Saint Mary's Township in Perry County, Missouri.

History 

Yount was established in 1886 as Yount's Store, and was named for Henry Yount, a merchant and storekeeper, as well as a postmaster and county judge.  The name was shortened to Yount in 1888.   The post office operated in Yount from 1887 until 1954.

Mt. Pisca Lutheran Church was founded in Yount in 1852 and continued until 1868.  In that same year, the church became the Mt. Zion Lutheran Church which existed until 1974.

Geography 

References 

Unincorporated communities in Perry County, Missouri
Unincorporated communities in Missouri